Regulated verse – also known as Jintishi – is a development within Classical Chinese poetry of the shi main formal type. Regulated verse is one of the most important of all Classical Chinese poetry types. Although often regarded as a Tang Dynasty innovation, the origin of regulated verse within the Classical Chinese poetic tradition is associated with Shen Yue (441–513), based on his "four tones and eight defects" (四聲八病) theory regarding tonality. There are three types of regulated verse: the eight-lined lüshi, the four-lined jueju, and the linked couplets of indeterminate length pailu. All regulated verse forms are rhymed on the even lines, with one rhyme being used throughout the poem. Also, and definitionally, the tonal profile of the poem is controlled (that is, "regulated"). Furthermore, semantic and tonal parallelism is generally required of certain interior couplets. During the Tang Dynasty, the "Shen-Song" team of Shen Quanqi and Song Zhiwen greatly contributed to the development of this Classical Chinese verse form.

Formal rules
Regulated verse consisting of the three jintishi or "new style poetry" forms of lushi, jueju, and pailu while retaining the basic characteristics that are distinguished from the gushi or "old style poetry" by the addition of a number of formal rules, most of which they share in common, but in some of which they differ. These rules include:

Number of lines are limited to four for jueju, eight for lushi, and an unlimited, greater, even number for the pailu. In each case, the poem is arranged in paired lines in the form of couplets.
Line lengths are all the same in terms of syllables or characters throughout any given poem. Generally, the line length is fixed at five or seven or characters per line; although, there are some poems which have a six character line-length. The line length is also used for the purpose of further classifying the main three forms of regulated verse into subtypes.
Rhyme is mandatory. Rhyme, or rime, is based on a sometimes somewhat technical rhyme scheme. The rhyme of a poem can be difficult to determine, especially for older poems as pronounced in modern versions of Chinese; however, even as early as the Tang Dynasty, formal rhyme might be based upon authoritative references in a rime table or rime dictionary, rather than on actual vernacular speech. Generally level tones only rhyme with level tones, and non-level (or "deflected") tones only formally rhyme with other non-level tones. Also, the first line of the poem may also set the rhyme, more often in the seven-character form than the five-character.
The pattern of tonality within the poem is regulated according to certain fixed patterns of alternating level and deflected tones. Although there is some question as to the status of tone in older forms of Chinese, in Middle Chinese (characteristic of the Chinese of the Sui Dynasty, Tang Dynasty, and Song Dynasty), a four tone system developed. For the purposes of regulated verse, the important distinction is between the level tone (píng 平, similar to the modern Mandarin Chinese first tone) and the other three tones which are grouped in the category of deflected tones (zè 仄).
Parallelism is a feature of regulated verse. The parallelism requirement means that the two parallel lines must match each word in each line with the word which is in the same position in the other line, the match can be in terms of grammatical function, comparison or contrast, phonology, among other considerations: the degree of parallelism can vary and the type of parallelism is crucial to the meaning of a well-written regulated verse poem. Phonological parallelism can include various considerations, including tonality. Grammatical function parallelism examples include matching colors, actions, numeric quantities and so on. In the eight-line lushi form, which is composed of four couplets, the middle two couplets have internal parallelism; that is, the third and fourth line are parallel with each other and the fifth and sixth lines are parallel with each other. The jueju is more flexible in terms of required parallelism, although it may be present. The pailu requires parallelism for all couplets except for the first and last pair.
The caesura, or a pause between certain phrases within any given line is a standard feature of regulated verse, with the main rule being for a major caesura preceding the last three syllables within a line. Thus, in the six-line verse the major caesura divides the line into two three-character halves. Furthermore, in the seven-character line, there is generally a minor caesura between the first and second pairs of characters.

See also
Classical Chinese poetry
Classical Chinese poetry forms
Du Fu
Shen Quanqi
Song Zhiwen

References

Citations

Sources 

 Davis, A. R. (Albert Richard), Editor and Introduction,(1970), The Penguin Book of Chinese Verse. (Baltimore: Penguin Books).
 Frankel, Hans H. (1978). The Flowering Plum and the Palace Lady. (New Haven and London: Yale University Press) 
 Mair, Victor and Tsu-Lin Mei (1991), "The Sanskrit Origins of Recent Style Prosody”, Harvard Journal of Asiatic Studies, 51.2, 375–470.
 
 Watson, Burton (1971). CHINESE LYRICISM: Shih Poetry from the Second to the Twelfth Century. New York, NY: Columbia University Press. 

Chinese poetry forms